Gordon Lloyd Wilson (born 1955) is a Canadian politician, who was elected to the Nova Scotia House of Assembly in the 2013 provincial election. A member of the Nova Scotia Liberal Party, he represented the electoral district of Clare-Digby until his retirement from politics in 2021.

On April 24, 2019, Wilson was appointed to the Executive Council of Nova Scotia as Minister of Environment.

Electoral record

|-

|Liberal
|Gordon Wilson
|align="right"| 5,122
|align="right"| 54.68
|align="right"| N/A
|-

|Progressive Conservative
|Paul Emile LeBlanc
|align="right"| 2,911
|align="right"| 31.08
|align="right"| N/A
|-

|New Democratic Party
|Dean Kenley
|align="right"| 842
|align="right"| 8.99
|align="right"| N/A
|-

|Independent
|Ian Thurber
|align="right"| 492
|align="right"| 5.25
|align="right"| N/A
|-
|}

References

External links
 Members of the Nova Scotia Legislative Assembly

Living people
Nova Scotia Liberal Party MLAs
People from Digby County, Nova Scotia
21st-century Canadian politicians
Members of the Executive Council of Nova Scotia
1955 births